Abbotts Creek starts in Kernersville, NC in Forsyth County and becomes High Rock Lake near Lexington, NC in Davidson County just north of Hwy 47. The section of High Rock Lake that is officially Abbotts Creeks ends near the Hwy 8 causeway, in Southmont, NC.

The median flow at Lexington ranges from 50 to 200 cubic feet per second. While it only provides a relatively small amount of water that enters the lake, it provides a significant fraction of the total surface area of the lake and hosts a large community of lake front homes, as well as provides significant habitat for fish and wildlife. The upper sections of the lake at Abbotts Creek do not have lake front properties and are considered prime area for sports fishing, particularly largemouth bass and catfish.

The lake, up to the high water mark is under the control of Alcoa and is managed under contract granted by the US government.

Gallery

See also 

 Lexington, North Carolina
 Southmont, North Carolina
 High Rock Lake Association
 Yadkin River

Maps

References

External links 
 Historical average discharges
 Alcoa - Current Official Conditions at High Rock Lake
 High Rock Lake Association
 High-Rock.com A collection of links, images, travel and directory info for the area
 High Rock River Rats
 SaveHighRockLake.org

Rivers of Davidson County, North Carolina
Rivers of Forsyth County, North Carolina
Rivers of North Carolina
Tributaries of the Pee Dee River